Peng Chau Kaito Limited is a small kai-to ferry operator in Hong Kong. The company runs services between Peng Chau and Discovery Bay with occasional stops at the Trappist Monastery on Lantau Island, as well as the route between Discovery Bay and Mui Wo. The main route between Peng Chau and Discovery Bay received an estimated 1,420 passengers per day in 2013. The company also offers vessel hire. The routes which serve Peng Chau make use of the Peng Chau Public Pier.

Service
In 2012, the company was granted permission from the government to reduce the frequency of its route between Discovery Bay and Mui Wo to reduce costs which had risen due to an increase in fuel prices. The service was suspended the following year as a result of extra requirements the government imposed in the wake of the 2012 Lamma Island ferry collision.

Fleet
The company maintains a fleet of 3 vessels:
 Wing Yip No.10
Built in 1990, the launch was produced in Guangdong Province, China. The vessel serves mainly the Peng Chau >> Trappist Monastery >> Discovery Bay route. Registration number: A5573
 Ma Wan No.1
Built in 1995 in Zhuhai, Guangdong Province, China. The ferry has an air-conditioned lower deck. The vessel mainly runs the route between Mui Wo and Discovery Bay. Registration number: A9433
 Sing Way 3
Serves the Peng Chau >> Trappist Monastery >> Discovery Bay route. Registration number: A6093

Fare
The following table outlines the fare for the Peng Chau >> Discovery Bay route.

See also
 Transport in Hong Kong

References

Peng Chau
Ferry transport in Hong Kong
Transport operators of Hong Kong